1797 in sports describes the year's events in world sport.

Boxing
Events
 22 August — Jack Bartholomew defeated Tom Owen in 26 rounds at Moulsey Hurst to claim the Championship of England. Bartholomew held the title until 1800.

Cricket
Events
 Marylebone Cricket Club (MCC) enjoyed great success on the field, the team winning nine of its eleven matches.
England
 Most runs – Lord Frederick Beauclerk 758
 Most wickets – Lord Frederick Beauclerk 66

Horse racing
England
 The Derby – colt by Fidget
 The Oaks – Nike
 St Leger Stakes – Lounger

References

 
1797